The Lewis number (Le) is a dimensionless number defined as the ratio of thermal diffusivity to mass diffusivity. It is used to characterize fluid flows where there is simultaneous heat and mass transfer. The Lewis number puts the thickness of the thermal boundary layer in relation to the concentration boundary layer. The Lewis number is defined as
.
where  is the thermal diffusivity and  the mass diffusivity,  the thermal conductivity,  the density,  the mixture-averaged diffusion coefficient, and  the specific heat capacity at constant pressure. In the field of fluid mechanics, many sources define the Lewis number to be the inverse of the above definition.

The Lewis number can also be expressed in terms of the Prandtl number and the Schmidt number :
.

It is named after Warren K. Lewis (1882–1975), who was the first head of the Chemical Engineering Department at MIT. Some workers in the field of combustion assume (incorrectly) that the Lewis number was named for Bernard Lewis (1899–1993), who for many years was a major figure in the field of combustion research.

Literature

References

Dimensionless numbers
Fluid dynamics
Dimensionless numbers of fluid mechanics
Combustion